Haut-Mbomou is one of the 16 prefectures of the Central African Republic. Its capital is Obo. The African Pole of Inaccessibility is located here.

References

 
Prefectures of the Central African Republic